Flor sem Tempo (English title: Timeless Love) is a Portuguese telenovela produced by SP Televisão and broadcast by SIC. It premiered on 30 January 2023. The telenovela is written by Inês Gomes with the collaboration of Cândida Ribeiro, Rita Roberto, Ana Casaca, Ana Vasques, José Pinto Carneiro e Manuel Carneiro. It stars Bárbara Branco, Francisco Froes, Albano Jerónimo, Maria João Bastos, Joana Santos, Luís Esparteiro, Cristina Homem de Mello e José Wallenstein.

Plot 
The Torres are wine producers and the most powerful family in Vila Santa. The patriarch Fernando, born in the village, is known by all as a fair and benevolent man, quite different from the other heirs: his children and grandchildren.

Each of the Torres' heirs aspires to be Fernando's successor, but he trusts no one except his grandson Vasco, the only one who stays out of the family wars and who has been traveling the world. Now the patriarch feels he needs to prepare his succession and asks Vasco to come home. Caetana, Vasco's sister, is the one who feels most threatened and will do anything to get to power and keep her brother out of the way.

Meanwhile, when Vasco returns to Vila Santa, he runs into Catarina Valente, the daughter of the maid who mysteriously disappeared from the Torres' farm. Just out of jail, Catarina demands to know what happened to her mother. The police rule out a murder and claim that Leonor has decided to leave her job and her family. But Jorge Valente, Catarina's father, is convinced that his wife is dead and blames Torres' family. To find out the truth, Catarina moves to Vila Santa and infiltrates the Torres' farm to investigate. This is how Catarina falls in love with Vasco, but it’s hard to ignore that he’s part of the family that "stole" her mother.

Catarina's family, on the other hand, is a real troublemaker. The Valente's are broke, living off scams and petty theft, with Catarina trying to keep them from committing crimes and getting caught up in the trouble they get into. While she tries to get the family on track, to raise and protect her younger sister, her father is always getting into trouble.

The story will focus on the love between Catarina and Vasco, the search for Leonor, the Valente family’s troubles and the secrets and wars of Torres, a family in which everyone fights and betrays each other in order to have more power.

A story about love, justice, and fight for power.

Cast 
 Bárbara Branco as Catarina Valente
 Francisco Froes as Vasco Vaz Torres
 Albano Jerónimo as Jorge Valente
 Maria João Bastos as Leonor Valente
 Joana Santos as Caetana Vaz Torres
 Luís Esparteiro as Eduardo Vaz
 Cristina Homem de Mello as Vitória Torres
 José Wallenstein as Luís Maria Soares
 Marina Mota as Julieta Formiga
 Fernando Luís as Teodoro Mosquito
 Luísa Cruz as Cremilde Mosquito
 Rui Morisson as Fernando Torres
 Custódia Gallego as Elisa Mosquito
 João Lagarto as Belmiro Fontes
 Gonçalo Diniz as António Formiga
 Sandra Barata Belo as Rosa Santos
 Jorge Corrula as Ricardo Soares Torres
 Débora Monteiro as Diana Sousa
 Vítor Silva Costa as David Sousa
 Dânia Neto as Mariana Campos
 Diogo Amaral as Sebastião Soares Torres
 Bruna Quintas as Miquelina «Mimi» Mosquito
 Diogo Valsassina as Jaime Fontes
 Joana Aguiar as Filipa Fontes
 João Maneira as António José «Tozé» Valente
 Bia Wong as Cláudia Santos
 Luís Ganito as Gabriel Mosquito
 João Bettencourt as Gonçalo Formiga
 Mariana Cardoso as Vera Valente
 Lara Chelinho as Marta Valente
 Ricardo Mata Ribeiro as Salvador Tourais Torres
 Francisco Valente as Lourenço Tourais Torres

Guest cast 
 Rita Blanco as Natália Sousa
 Alexandra Lencastre as Madalena Torres
 Rita Ribeiro as Graça Barata

Production 
In 2021, the pre-production for the telenovela began. One year later, the first scenes began to be filmed in 14 November 2022 in SP Televisão studios and also later in Azeitão and on the outskirts of Lisboa, like Cascais, that serve to give life to the fictional village Vila Santa, and Palmela in Hotel Casa Palmela, that serves to give life to the Torres family mansion.

Ratings 

Premiering with the purpose of raising the audiences left with Amor Amor - Vol. 2, Flor Sem Tempo saw the one of the worst pilot-episode rating of the first track of telenovelas broadcast by SIC, drawing a rating of 10.5 points and audience share of 21.4%.

Since the first episode, the telenovela begins to show some leadship in the audiences, although not be every day.

References

External links 

Portuguese telenovelas
2023 telenovelas
Sociedade Independente de Comunicação telenovelas
Portuguese-language telenovelas
Television shows set in Portugal